Luis Jose Santander (born April 8, 1960) is a Venezuelan actor. Santander was born in the United States and raised in Venezuela.

Santander was not an instant sensation, as he had to work hard to become famous. He labored as an actor in small plays around Venezuela when his chance to become famous arrived in 1987. That year, he made his television debut in "Y la Luna Tambien" ("And the Moon Too"), which became a major international hit, reaching important numbers in Puerto Rico, Mexico and Ecuador, among others. It wasn't until 1988, however, when, at the age of 28, he became a teen idol following the smash success of "Niña Bonita" ("Pretty Girl"). This production, which was produced by Venevision and had nothing in common storywise with the latter Hollywood hit "Pretty Woman", was a major hit all over Latin America propelling Santander and his female co-star, Ruddy Rodríguez, into super-stardom in the area. The telenovela's title song "Tan Enamorados" also propelled singer Ricardo Montaner into international fame.

"Niña Bonita"'s success raised both Santander and Rodriguez's rentability in the high-paying Hispanic soap opera world. In Santander's case, he followed "Niña Bonita" with "Maribel" in 1989. While not as successful as "Niña Bonita", "Maribel" was also a large hit for the Venezuelan actor.

In 1991, he participated in "Mundo de Fieras", which was another large success on the Venezuelan and United States Latino television viewer's ratings.

By then, his telenovelas had caused so much interest, that Santander became well known in Europe as well, with many of his soap operas being shown in places like Russia and Hungary.

In 1993, Santander participated in "Macarena". Whether the title of this song had anything to do with the latter hit, "Macarena", is unknown.

In 1994, he participated in "Morena Clara" ("Brown Girl"), which, again, would prove that he was among Venezuelans' favorite actors.

In a surprise move, he went to Mexico in 1996, contracted by that country's largest network, Televisa, to film Lazos de Amor, ("Love Ties") alongside Mexican superstar Lucero.  Odd as it might sound to many, at the age of 37, Santander recovered his status as a teen idol, at least in Mexico, where that soap opera became a classic of Mexican television, due in part to the following he generated among Mexican Teenaged girl. Afterward, he starred in "Te sigo amando" ("I will still love you") (1996) with Claudia Ramirez and Sergio Goyri.

After filming "Vidas Prestadas" ("Borrowed Lives") in 2000, Santander has lived in semi-retirement, often flying between Mexico and Venezuela for interviews and special occasions, including appearing in "Inocente de ti" alongside Camila Sodi and Valentino Lanus.

In 2006 Santander returned to Venezuela to star in the telenovela "Silvia Rivas, divorciada".
In 2007 Santander appeared in the telenovela "Voltea pa' que te enamores".

In 2007 he was also invited to participate in the Telenovela "Pasión" which was produced by Carla Estrada in México and was shown in several countries around the world.  Carla Estrada also produced "Lazos de Amor" (Love Ties) which was mentioned before.

In "Pasión" Santander plays "Foreman", a British Pirate, and the story is situated around 1780 in what used to be "Nueva España" (New Spain).

The telenovela industry has valuable presences, but there is only one dimension of Luis
Jose Santander. This charismatic artist with extensive experience, was born in Fort Collins, Colorado, USA, where his parents were studying. Luis Jose arrived in Venezuela at an early age, and grew up in an environment where artistic manifestations were present every day as painters, poets, and illustrious musicians who visited the house of his parents.

After completing his primary and secondary studies, he put aside his parents dream that he study medicine, instead choosing to study acting.  He achieved a scholarship to study drama in the United States in Bridgeport Connecticut,
where he perfected the mastery of the language of Shakespeare.

José Luis has received several awards among which are: Mara Gold, Meridian Gold, TVyNovelas, Silver Star——the latter two of Mexico, among others.  His popularity has steadily increased and with it he has received multiple invitations to participate in events and programs in America, Europe, and even Asia.

Filmography

Television

References

1960 births
Living people
Venezuelan people of American descent
Venezuelan male telenovela actors